John Candler (7 October 1873 – 4 December 1942) was an English cricketer. He played seven first-class matches for Cambridge University Cricket Club between 1894 and 1895.

Candler set an unwanted record by failing to score in his first nine first-class innings over six matches in 1894 and 1895. He finally scored in his seventh and final first-class match, making 8 not out.

See also
 List of Cambridge University Cricket Club players

Notes

References

External links
 

1873 births
1942 deaths
English cricketers
Cambridge University cricketers